Analytic Philosophy is a quarterly peer-reviewed academic journal covering all areas of philosophy. It is published by Wiley and the editor-in-chief is David Sosa (University of Texas at Austin). It was established in 1960 as Philosophical Books, obtaining its current title in 2011.

Abstracting and indexing
The journal is abstracted and indexed in the Arts and Humanities Citation Index, Current Contents/Arts & Humanities, and the Philosopher's Index.

References

External links

Philosophy journals
Publications established in 1960
Quarterly journals
Wiley (publisher) academic journals
English-language journals